Legal Eagle or LegalEagle may refer to:

Aviation 
 Milholland Legal Eagle, a 1998 American aircraft design kit that is FAR Part 103 "legal"

Film and television 
 Legal Eagles, a 1986 American trial film starring Robert Redford and Debra Winger
 Legal Eagles (TV series), a 2017 Singaporean drama starring Felicia Chin and Zhang Zhenhuan
 Legal Eagle, a show-within-a-show in the 1972–1985 American cartoon television series Fat Albert and the Cosby Kids, featuring a crime-fighting cartoon eagle character

People 
 Devin Stone, an American lawyer and YouTuber, with a YouTube channel named LegalEagle and a company called Legal Eagle, LLC.

See also